The Sierra Leonean High Commissioner to the United Kingdom is the official representative of the Government of Sierra Leone to the Government of the United Kingdom.
The Sierra Leone High Commissioner to the Court of St James's is also commissioned to Nicosia (Cyprus), accredited as ambassador to Dublin (Ireland), Madrid (Spain), Lisbon (Portugal), Oslo (Norway), Copenhagen (Denmark), Stockholm (Sweden) and Athens (Greece).

List of representatives

References 

 
United Kingdom
Sierra Leone